Schweinsteiger is a German-language surname. Notable people with the surname include:

 Ana Schweinsteiger (born Ivanović, 1987), Serbian tennis player.
 Bastian Schweinsteiger (born 1984), German footballer.
 Tobias Schweinsteiger (born 1982), German footballer.

German-language surnames